José Alberto Reus Fortunati (born October 24, 1955 Flores da Cunha, Rio Grande do Sul) is a Brazilian lawyer, politician, and member of the Democratic Labour Party (PDT). Fortunati served as the Mayor of Porto Alegre from March 30, 2010 to January 1, 2017. He won re-election in 2012 with 65.2% of the vote in the city's mayoral election.

Fortunati was previously a member of the national Chamber of Deputies from 1990 to 1996.

See also
 List of mayors of Porto Alegre
 Timeline of Porto Alegre

References

1955 births
Mayors of Porto Alegre
Members of the Chamber of Deputies (Brazil) from Rio Grande do Sul
Democratic Labour Party (Brazil) politicians
Workers' Party (Brazil) politicians
Living people